The 2006 ISAF World Sailing Games was held at Lake Neusiedl, Austria 10–20 May.

The events were 420 team racing, 470 (men and women), 49er, women's Hobie 16, Hobie Tiger, men's Laser, women's Laser Radial, and RS:X (men and women). In the 2006 event, sailors from similar classes were invited to participate, e.g. the medalists from 2005 Finn Gold Cup and the world champions in Byte, Contender, and OK were invited to the men's one-person dinghy event in Laser.

Competition format

Events and equipment
Of each countries entries, two were initially accepted: the first entry from the country and the entry that was best-ranked on the most recent ISAF World Sailing Rankings for the corresponding Olympic event. Additionally, the organising committee could accept the second-fastest entry per country if the quota of the event was not yet reached. Champions and medalists of the latest World championships could enter outside the national restrictions as listed below. Also top-ten of the 15 February 2006 ISAF World Sailing Rankings and current World champions in Olympic classes (except Yngling, Finn and Star), as well as top-four of the 2005 Team Sailing World Championships were qualified.

Invited sailors

Summary

Medal table

Event medalists

References

ISAF World Sailing Games
ISAF World Sailing Games
Sailing competitions in Austria
ISAF World Sailing Games